Hatsune may refer to:

Eriko Hatsune, Japanese actress
Mai Hatsune (born 1978), as known as "Dragon Lady", Japanese Mahjong player
Hatsune Matsushima (born 1987), Japanese gravure model, talent and actress
Hatsune Okumura (born 1990), Japanese singer-songwriter signed to Avex Trax

See also
Hatsune Miku, a Vocaloid software voicebank
Hatsu
Hatsue

Japanese-language surnames
Japanese feminine given names